Félix Mengin was a French trader, temporary French consul and writer in Cairo.

He came to Egypt with Napoléon Bonaparte's mission. He wrote several books about the history of Egypt, Saudi Arabia and other Arab countries including a History of Egypt in era of Mohammed Ali Pasha.

Books 
 Histoire de l'Égypte sous le gouvernement de Mohammed-Aly  Félix Mengin, Joseph Agoub (1795-1832), Edme-François Jomard - 1823

References 

19th-century French historians
French male non-fiction writers